Christine Ann Kapostasy-Jansing (born January 30, 1957) is an American television journalist. She anchors Chris Jansing Reports airing from 1:00 p.m. to 3:00 p.m. ET weekdays on MSNBC, having replaced MTP Daily in May 2022.

Jansing previously hosted Jansing and Company on MSNBC from 2010 to 2014, and served as the NBC News senior White House correspondent from 2014 to 2017.

Early life and education
Jansing was born to a Roman Catholic family in Fairport Harbor, Ohio, the youngest of 12 children of Joseph and Tilly Kapostasy. She is of Hungarian and Slovak descent. Originally a political science major, Jansing switched majors to broadcast journalism after working for the college radio station. In 1978, she graduated from Otterbein College with a Bachelor of Arts degree.

Career

After college, she worked as an intern at a cable station in Columbus, Ohio, and then accepted a job for a short stint at radio station WIPS (AM) in Ticonderoga, New York. She then accepted a position as a general assignment reporter for WNYT television in Albany, New York, where she quickly rose to become the weekend anchor and then the weekly co-anchor. She stayed at WNYT for 17 years. While there, she won a New York Emmy Award in 1997 for her coverage of the Olympic Park bombing in Atlanta. Jansing joined NBC News in June 1998, at which point she began to use the last name of Jansing professionally instead of her maiden name of Kapostasy that she had used before then. She has since anchored and reported for MSNBC and has been a substitute anchor for The Today Show, and the Sunday version of NBC Nightly News. In 2008, she relocated to Los Angeles and worked as a field reporter for two years before returning as an anchor in 2010. Chris Jansing previously anchored the 10 am hour on MSNBC weekdays on Jansing and Company, with Richard Lui regularly serving as a correspondent and substitute anchor. The show ended on June 13, 2014, when Jansing became NBC's Senior White House Correspondent.

On June 1, 2017, Jansing was named senior national correspondent for MSNBC. As part of the role, Jansing would continue to anchor the network's breaking news coverage alongside Brian Williams, as well as provide coverage from the White House and Capitol Hill.
On May 6, 2022, it was announced that with the move of MTP Daily to NBC News NOW, Jansing would take over the slot with her own hour of MSNBC Reports. Her show will expand to two hours on February 13, 2023.

Awards
 An Emmy Award for her coverage of the 1996 Olympic Park bombing at the Olympic Games in Atlanta.  She also has a second Emmy Award.
 "Best Person" award from the New York State Broadcasters Association for her report on hunger in New York State.
 Inducted into the New York State Broadcasters Association Hall of Fame in June 2016.

Personal life
In 1982, she married Robert Jansing, a chemist, who ran an analytical chemistry laboratory, and in 1998, upon her move to NBC, she began using her married name.  She explained it was easier for viewers to pronounce.

The couple subsequently divorced.

References

External links

 NBC News bio
 

1957 births
Living people
American television news anchors
American television reporters and correspondents
American women television journalists
MSNBC people
NBC News people
Otterbein University alumni
American people of Hungarian descent
American people of Slovak descent
People from Lake County, Ohio
American journalists
20th-century American journalists
21st-century American journalists
Journalists from Ohio
21st-century American women
American Roman Catholics